Sünuhi Arsan (1899 – 1970) was a Turkish judge. He was the first president of the Constitutional Court of Turkey from June 22, 1962 until July 13, 1964.

References

External links
Web-site of the Constitutional Court of Turkey 

Turkish judges
Turkish civil servants
1899 births
1970 deaths
Presidents of the Constitutional Court of Turkey
Istanbul University Faculty of Law alumni